Johanne Fridlund (born 24 July 1996) is a Norwegian footballer who plays as a forward for Lazio. In 2022 she was called up to the Norway national team.

Career
She hails from Stavern.
Fridlund started her senior career with Norwegian third tier side EIK. Before the 2014 season, she signed for Vålerenga in the Norwegian top flight, but left due to lack of motivation. Before the 2019 season, Fridlund signed for Norwegian second-tier club Grei. Before the 2020 season, she signed for Kolbotn in the Norwegian top flight. Before the second half of 2021–22, she signed for Italian team Lazio.

She was a prolific youth international, especially with Norway U19.

References

External links
 Johanne Fridlund at playmakerstats.com

1996 births
Living people
People from Larvik
Women's association football forwards
Norwegian women's footballers
Norway women's youth international footballers
Expatriate women's footballers in Italy
Kolbotn Fotball players
Norwegian expatriate sportspeople in Italy
Serie A (women's football) players
S.S. Lazio Women 2015 players
Toppserien players
Vålerenga Fotball Damer players
Association football forwards
Norway international footballers